An inverted roller coaster is a roller coaster in which the train runs under the track with the seats directly attached to the wheel carriage. This latter attribute is what sets it apart from the older suspended coaster, which runs under the track, but swings via a pivoting bar attached to the wheel carriage. The coaster type's inverted orientation, where the passengers' legs are exposed, distinguishes it from a traditional roller coaster, where only the passengers' upper body parts, including the arms, are exposed.

The inverted coaster was pioneered by the Swiss roller coaster designers Bolliger & Mabillard in the early 1990s. The first installation came at Six Flags Great America in 1992.

Other roller coaster manufacturers followed in the footsteps of Bolliger & Mabillard and began working on their own inverted coaster designs, including Vekoma, Intamin and other smaller companies. Intamin has few designs classified as inverted coasters, although they do install inverted coaster trains on some of their launched designs. Vekoma, on the other hand, predominantly mass-produced the same design (Suspended Looping Coaster ) with 41 identical coasters installed around the world, though Vekoma now markets a newer style of inverted coaster, the Suspended Thrill Coaster, which utilises lap-bar restraints instead of the traditional over-the-shoulder restraints. Also, in recent years, Vekoma has become the first manufacturer to install a family-friendly inverted roller coaster. Giovanola also has a single inverted coaster operating, which uses the box-track design, also used by Bolliger & Mabillard.

The inversions usually includes a vertical loop, zero-g roll, Immelmann loop, cobra roll, and a corkscrew, though Vekoma SLCs almost always feature Sidewinder and in-line twist elements.

Installations 
231 inverted roller coasters have been installed at various theme parks, some of which have been relocated. The following list is not exhaustive and only shows the most notable installations.

Gallery

See also
Wing Coaster
Suspended roller coaster
Pipeline roller coaster

References

External links 

Bolliger & Mabillard official site
Intamin official site
Vekoma official site

 
Types of roller coaster
Roller coasters manufactured by Bolliger & Mabillard
Roller coasters manufactured by Vekoma
Roller coasters manufactured by Intamin